Scattered, Smothered and Covered is a covers album by American rock band Hootie & the Blowfish, released in 2000. The album was named in honor of Waffle House, a Southern restaurant chain. One of Waffle House's advertising campaigns used the phrase "scattered, smothered and covered," a reference to hash browns prepared with onions and cheese.

Track listing

Personnel
Credits adapted from album's liner notes.

Hootie and the Blowfish
 Mark Bryan – guitars, vocals, mandolin (track 9), Wurlitzer (11), electric mandolin (14)
 Dean Felber – bass, vocals, acoustic guitar (track 14)
 Darius Rucker – vocals, guitars, fade out guitar solo (track 8)
 Jim Sonefeld – drums, percussion, vocals, acoustic guitar (track 14)

Additional musicians
 Susan Cowsill – harmony vocals (track 12)
 Ron De La Vega – bass (track 9)
 Gary Greene – percussion (track 15)
 Nanci Griffith – vocals (track 9)
 Peter Holsapple – mandolin (track 4)
 James Hooker – Hammond B3 (track 9)
 Jamie Hoover – organ (track 13), 12-string guitar (14)
 Doug Lancio – guitar (track 9)
 Edwin McCain – vocals (track 15)
 Pat McInerney – percussion (track 9)
 Jon Nau – keyboards
 Gena Rankin – harmony vocals (tracks 1, 3)
 Craig Shields – baritone saxophone (track 15)
 Tim Sommer – organ (track 2)
 The Walker Sisters – backing vocals (track 11)

Production
 Mark Dearnley – remixing and mastering
 Don Dixon – producer, engineer, and mixer (track 15)
 Don Gehman – producer, engineer, and mixer (tracks 1-12), remixing and mastering
 Jim Goodwin – mixing assistant (track 4)
 John Harris – engineer (track 9)
 Billy Huelin – live sound engineer
 Curt Kroeger – assistant engineer (track 12)
 Dave Leonard – mixing (track 12)
 Wade Norton – engineer (track 1), assistant engineer (2, 3)
 David Puryear – assistant engineer (track 15)
 Tracy Schroeder – engineer (track 11), assistant engineer (13-15), mixing assistant (13, 14)
 Roger Sommers – assistant engineer (track 12)
 Liz Sroka – assistant engineer (tracks 1-3)
 Doug Trantow – engineer and mixing (track 12)
 Mark Williams – producer (track 15), engineer, and mixer (13-15), assistant engineer (4)

References

External links
 

Hootie & the Blowfish albums
Albums produced by Don Gehman
2000 compilation albums
Covers albums
Atlantic Records compilation albums
B-side compilation albums
Waffle House